The name Pat has been used for six tropical cyclones in the Western Pacific Ocean:

 Typhoon Pat (1948)
 Typhoon Pat (1951)
 Typhoon Pat (1982) – a Category 3 typhoon that neared the Philippines.
 Typhoon Pat (1985) – impacted southern Japan and was known as one of three cyclones that interacted with each other.
 Typhoon Pat (1988) – a Category 1 typhoon that hit the Philippines.
 Typhoon Pat (1991) – a Category 4 typhoon that did not affect land.
 Typhoon Pat (1994) – a Category 2 typhoon that did not affect land.

It has also been used for two tropical cyclones in the South Pacific Ocean:

 Tropical Cyclone Pat (1977) – a weak and short-lived tropical cyclone.
 Cyclone Pat (2010) – affected the Cook Islands.

Pacific typhoon set index articles
South Pacific cyclone set index articles